A memorial to the Sikh Regiment was unveiled in Wednesfield, Wolverhampton, in September 2021. The  statue by artist Luke Perry commemorates the Battle of Saragarhi.

References

2021 establishments in England
2021 sculptures
Buildings and structures in Wolverhampton
Military monuments and memorials
Monuments and memorials in England
Sculptures of men in the United Kingdom
Statues in England